Australia competed at the 1896 Summer Olympics in Athens, Greece, from 6 to 15 April 1896.
One athlete from Victoria, a British colony which later formed part of Australia, competed at the 1896 Summer Olympics in Athens, Greece.  Edwin Flack was born in England and was resident in London in 1896, but spent most of his life in Australia and so is considered an Australian athlete by the International Olympic Committee.

The Union Flag was used as the flag for the Australian colonies as well as Great Britain and Ireland at the 1896 Summer Olympics.

At the end of these Olympics, Australia was ranked in eighth position on the medal table with a total of 2 medals (2 gold).

Flack was the only competitor from an Australian colony.  He entered five events, winning medals in three. The bronze medal in tennis, however, was part of a mixed team and therefore is not counted for Australia.

Medalists

Medals awarded to participants of mixed-NOC teams are represented in italics. These medals are not counted towards the individual NOC medal tally.

Multiple medalists
The following competitors won multiple medals at the 1896 Olympic Games.

Competitors

| width=78% align=left valign=top |
The following is the list of number of competitors in the Games.

| width="22%" align="left" valign="top" |

Athletics

Both of Flack's gold medals came in the athletics competitions as he won both of his track races.

Track & road events

Tennis

In the singles tournament, Flack lost the only match he competed in. His loss in the semifinals of the doubles competition, while carrying no prize at the time, earned him a retroactive bronze medal from the International Olympic Committee.  This medal is counted for mixed team rather than Australia, however.

Notes

References

  (Digitally available at )
  (Excerpt available at )

External links

Australian Olympic Committee

Nations at the 1896 Summer Olympics
1896
Olympics